Kenrick Park is a tram stop in Sandwell, England on the outskirts of West Bromwich, named after the adjacent park of the same name. It was opened on 31 May 1999 and is situated on West Midlands Metro Line 1. It is the first stop outside the city of Birmingham on the tram-only alignment.

Services
Mondays to Fridays, Midland Metro services in each direction between Birmingham and Wolverhampton run at six to eight-minute intervals during the day, and at fifteen-minute intervals during the evenings and on Sundays. They run at eight minute intervals on Saturdays.

References

 This stop's entry at thetrams.co.uk

West Midlands Metro stops
Transport in Sandwell
Railway stations in Great Britain opened in 1999